Organ is a surname. Notable people with the surname include:

 Bryan Organ (born 1935), English painter
 Diana Organ (born 1952), British politician
 Ellen Organ (1903–1908), Irish child venerated by some Roman Catholics
 Felix Organ (born 1999), English cricketer
 Gerry Organ (born 1944), Canadian football player
 Lawrence P. Organ (born 1959), Canadian businessman
 Marjorie Organ (1886–1930), Irish-born American illustrator, cartoonist, caricaturist and model for her painter husband Robert Henri
 Michael Organ (born 1956), Australian politician
 Michael Organ (drummer) (born 1953), American drummer 
 Tommy Organ (born 1963), American musician
 Tyne-James Organ (born 1995), Australian alternative rock singer and songwriter